We Are Still Here is a 2015 American horror film written and directed by Ted Geoghegan and starring Andrew Sensenig and Barbara Crampton as grieving parents who find themselves the focus of an attack by vengeful spirits. The film had its world premiere on 15 March 2015 at South by Southwest.

Plot
In 1979, following the death of their son Bobby in a car crash, Anne (Barbara Crampton) and Paul Sacchetti (Andrew Sensenig) have decided to move to a new home in rural New England. Paul hopes that it will be therapeutic for Anne, as the death has caused her to spiral into a deep depression. However, Anne starts claiming that Bobby is present in the house, and neighbor Cat McCabe warns them to leave. The house was built in the 1800s by the Dagmar family as a funeral home. The Dagmars were reportedly run out of the village after townspeople discovered that they were swindling their customers by selling the corpses and burying empty caskets.

Undeterred, Anne invites her friends May and Jacob Lewis (Lisa Marie and Larry Fessenden), as they are both spiritualists and could help contact Bobby. The couples go out to eat, during which time the Lewises' son Harry arrives with his girlfriend Daniella. Harry is killed by an apparition in the basement and Daniella flees in horror, only to be killed too. The Lewises and the Sacchettis head home, after which Cat's husband Dave arrives at the restaurant, murders a waitress, and angrily discusses the Dagmar house with the bartender, revealing that the house needs to feed every 30 years or the evil beneath it will search out fresh souls, destroying the town.

Jacob manages to convince a reluctant Paul to hold a séance with him while their wives are out. This ends with Jacob becoming possessed by the spirit of Lassander Dagmar, who reveals that they were never run out of town; rather the villagers used his family as a sacrifice to the evil under their home. Lassander, overcome with rage, causes Jacob to kill himself. His wife May tries to flee, only to be killed by Dave, who has come to the house with the other townspeople, determined to give the home what it wants. The Sacchettis hear the voice of Bobby urging them to leave, and flee upstairs as the townspeople break into the house.

The spirits of the Dagmar family proceed to violently murder most of the townspeople until only Dave, Paul, and Anne remain. Dave tries to kill Anne and Paul, but is killed by Lassander's spirit. As Paul and Anne stare at the carnage around them, the spirits of the family depart from the house, finally satisfied. Anne dazedly walks into the house's cellar, followed by Paul. As he peers down the stairs, Paul smiles and says "Hey Bobby."

Cast
 Barbara Crampton as Anne Sacchetti
 Andrew Sensenig as Paul Sacchetti
 Larry Fessenden as Jacob Lewis
 Lisa Marie as May Lewis
 Monte Markham as Dave McCabe
 Susan Gibney as Maddie
 Michael Patrick as Harry Lewis
 Kelsea Dakota as Daniella
 Guy Gane III as Lassander Dagmar
 Elissa Dowling as Eloise Dagmar
 Zorah Burress as Fiona Dagmar
 Marvin Patterson as Joe the Electrician
 Connie Neer as Cat McCabe
 Craig Simmons as Jethro

Production
Filmmaker Ted Geoghegan began work on the film as a tribute to The House by the Cemetery while working as a publicist for Dark Sky Films. Geoghegan had previously collaborated with Andreas Schnaas on various "low-budget shlock movies" as a writer and producer, but had never directed a film beforehand. After completing the script, he showed it to Dark Sky Films and Travis Stevens of Snowfort Pictures, who both agreed to produce the film.

Filming took place on February 7, 2014 in Rochester, New York, and in the villages of Palmyra and Shortsville. According to the director and the end credit sequence of the film, the events take place in the fictional township of Aylesbury, Massachusetts.

Soundtrack

The score was composed by Wojciech Golczewski. It was released on July 7, 2015 from Screamworks Records.

Track listing

Release
We Are Still Here had its World Premiere at South by Southwest on March 15, 2015. It was given a limited U.S. theatrical release by Dark Sky Films beginning on June 5, 2015 and was released via video-on-demand the same day. It was released on DVD and Blu-ray in the U.S. on October 6, 2015.

The film was subsequently released on home video in Australia, Canada, United Kingdom, Germany, Scandinavia, Spain, and Taiwan. It opened theatrically in Japan on December 12, 2015 and in Russia on December 17, 2015.

Reception
We Are Still Here was positively received at its world premiere and subsequent release. It became one of the year's most critically acclaimed horror films. Rolling Stone named it one of the year's ten best horror films. Review aggregator website Rotten Tomatoes reports an approval rating of 95% based on 43 reviews, and an average rating of 7.09/10. The site's critics' consensus states, "Smart, powerfully acted, and devilishly clever, We Are Still Here offers some novel twists on familiar territory – and heralds the arrival of a major talent in writer-director Ted Geoghegan." On Metacritic, the film has a score of 65 out of 100 based on 7 critics, indicating "generally favorable reviews".

Common elements of praise centered upon the film's atmosphere and visuals, which Twitch Film called "stylish and mesmerizing". Film School Rejects rated the film positively, praising it for its jump scares and stating that it "shows love and affection for genre".

References

External links
 
 
 
 

2015 films
2015 horror films
2010s ghost films
American haunted house films
American supernatural horror films
Films set in 1979
Films set in Massachusetts
Films shot in New York (state)
American ghost films
American films about revenge
American splatter films
2010s English-language films
2010s American films